Francisco Sánchez (born 2 March 1956) is a Dominican Republic boxer. He competed in the men's bantamweight event at the 1976 Summer Olympics.

References

External links
 

1956 births
Living people
Dominican Republic male boxers
Olympic boxers of the Dominican Republic
Boxers at the 1976 Summer Olympics
Place of birth missing (living people)
Bantamweight boxers